The 2022 Asian Men's Volleyball Challenge Cup was the second edition of the Asian Challenge Cup, a biennial international volleyball tournament organised by the Asian Volleyball Confederation (AVC) with Kyrgyzstan Volleyball Federation (KVF). The tournament was held in Cholpon-Ata, Kyrgyzstan from 29 August to 3 September 2022.

Qualification

Following the AVC regulations, The maximum of 16 teams in all AVC events will be selected by:
1 team for the host country
10 teams based on the final standing of the previous edition
5 teams from each of 5 zones (with a qualification tournament if needed)

Qualified teams
The following teams qualified for the tournament.

Venue

Pool standing procedure
 Total number of victories (matches won, matches lost)
 In the event of a tie, the following first tiebreaker will apply: The teams will be ranked by the most point gained per match as follows:
 Match won 3–0 or 3–1: 3 points for the winner, 0 points for the loser
 Match won 3–2: 2 points for the winner, 1 point for the loser
 Match forfeited: 3 points for the winner, 0 points (0–25, 0–25, 0–25) for the loser
 If teams are still tied after examining the number of victories and points gained, then the AVC will examine the results in order to break the tie in the following order:
 Set quotient: if two or more teams are tied on the number of points gained, they will be ranked by the quotient resulting from the division of the number of all set won by the number of all sets lost.
 Points quotient: if the tie persists based on the set quotient, the teams will be ranked by the quotient resulting from the division of all points scored by the total of points lost during all sets.
 If the tie persists based on the point quotient, the tie will be broken based on the team that won the match of the Round Robin Phase between the tied teams. When the tie in point quotient is between three or more teams, these teams ranked taking into consideration only the matches involving the teams in question.

Preliminary round
All times are Kyrgyzstan Time (UTC+6:00).

Ranking

|}

Match results
|}

Final round
All times are Kyrgyzstan Time (UTC+6:00).

Semifinals
|}

Third place match
|}

Final
|}

Final standing

Awards

Most Valuable Player

Best Setter

Best Outside Spikers

Best Middle Blockers

Best Opposite Spiker

Best Libero

See also
 2022 Asian Women's Volleyball Challenge Cup
 2022 Asian Men's Volleyball Cup

References

External links
Asian Volleyball Confederation – official website
Team Roster

2022
Asian Challenge Cup
August 2022 sports events in Asia
September 2022 sports events in Asia
2022 in volleyball